Yangxi Town is an urban town in Xinhua County, Hunan Province, People's Republic of China. It is the location of Xinhua South railway station.

Administrative division
The town is divided into 61 villages and one community, the following areas: 
 
  Xinxing Community
  Shanbei Village
  Changgangling Village
  Yachong Village
  Gutang Village
  Guanduqiao Village
  Jingping Village
  Mulong Village
  Baidi Village
  Baijing Village
  Baitang Village
  Taojiaqiao Village
  Jianxin Village
  Tangwan Village
  Lianxing Village
  Zhenlian Village
  Shanlian Village
  Jixing Village
  Xinyun Village
  Xinhe Village
  Dafanxi Village
  Xingxing Village
  Mingxing Village
  Yifeng Village
  Liuzhu Village
  Jinghua Village
  You'ai Village
  Shangche Village
  Longhuishan Village
  Chetianwan Village
  Longtanwan Village
  Xinqun Village
  Yumiaochang Village
  Changfengling Village
  Shuidong Village
  Qunyi Village
  Nanshanzhai Village
  Yuhua Village
  Jianhua Village
  Nanzhong Village
  Zhaibian Village
  Lengshuixiang Village
  Sanjing Village
  Shuanghua Village
  Shuangyuan Village
  Jianrong Village
  Shuangquan Village
  Zhongyi Village
  Shucai Village
  Dongchong Village
  Nitan Village
  Shiyan Village
  Shangsheng Village
  Longyandong Village
  Hejiadang Village
  Dajiangkou Village
  Cangxi Village
  Yueguangshan Village
  Hongfeng Village
  Longxing Village
  Huangniao Village
  Daijiadang Village

References

External links

Divisions of Xinhua County